Varsity Lakes railway station is located on the Gold Coast line in Queensland, Australia. It serves the Gold Coast suburb of Varsity Lakes.

History
Varsity Lakes station opened on 13 December 2009 as the terminal station of the Gold Coast line when it was extended from Robina.

Construction work on the four kilometre line extension from Robina commenced in late July 2007.

Services
Varsity Lakes is served by Gold Coast line services to Bowen Hills, Doomben and Brisbane Airport Domestic.

Services by platform

Transport links
Surfside Buslines operate five routes via Varsity Lakes station:
753: Burleigh Heads to Broadbeach South Interchange
757: Burleigh Heads to Reedy Creek
759: Robina station to Reedy Creek
760: Robina station to Tweed Heads via Gold Coast Airport
765: The Pines Elanora to Robina Town Centre via Christine Avenue

References

External links

Varsity Lakes station Queensland Rail

Railway stations in Australia opened in 2009
Railway stations in Gold Coast City
Varsity Lakes, Queensland